The Crypt School is a grammar school with  academy status for boys and girls located in the city of Gloucester. Founded in the 16th century, it was originally an all-boys school, but it made its sixth form co-educational in the 1980s, and moved to a mixed intake from year 7 in 2018, thereby becoming the only fully coeducational selective school in Gloucester. The school was founded in 1539 by Joan Cooke with money inherited from her husband John.

History

Founders

John Cooke (d. 1528) was a wealthy brewer and mercer of Gloucester, one of the city's earliest aldermen, serving as sheriff in 1494 and 1498. He held the office of mayor four times, in 1501, 1507, 1512 and 1518. He was a significant benefactor in the city during his life, but it was his will that started the process for the establishment of a grammar school in Gloucester. The scheme was given effect by his wife Joan Cooke, who survived him by 17 years, dying in 1545. It was Joan therefore who created the tripartite deed of 1539, deemed to be the founding charter. The school remains today the most ancient in Gloucester. A full account of the couple and their good works is described in the book by Roland Austin published in 1939 "Crypt School". A portrait of the pair painted some years after Joan's death is extant. It shows John in his mayoral robe, shaking hands with Joan and it is in the collection of Gloucester City Council.

Site 
In the school's 500-year history it has been sited in three different locations within the city of Gloucester. The original school was part of St Mary de Crypt Church in Southgate Street and the schoolroom can still be seen there. Later, in 1889, the school moved to Greyfriars, known better as Friar's Orchard, and in 1943, to its present site at Podsmead. The site on which the modern school is situated is land given to the school by Joan Cooke in 1539.

Status 
Despite attempts to change the school, notably in the 1960s with the move to comprehensive schools, the Crypt remains a selective grammar school. In 1987, there was the admission of girls in the sixth form entering in at the age of 16, and the transition towards a fully coeducational school began in 2018. Since April 2011, the school has been an academy independent of local authority control. The school has been fully co-educational since 2018.

Primary school 
In May 2018, the school announced plans to create a primary school, linked to the secondary school being built on the current Podsmead site. The new primary school would, unlike main school, be unselective and would be a free school.

Facilities 
Facilities at the school include:
 Largest non-commercial stage in Gloucestershire 
 Sixth Form Centre (also known as John and Joan Cooke Centre)
 Sports hall
 Modern Pavilion
 New Tennis and Netball courts as of 2019/20
 3 full-size rugby pitches 
 2 football pitches 
 2 cricket fields (1 natural green, 1 artificial green)
 Anthony Iles Block (Formerly Engineering Block)

Notable former pupils

Alumni of the school are known as Old Cryptians.

Religion 
 Michael Wrenford Hooper, Bishop of Ludlow from 2002–9
 John Moore (1730–1805), Archbishop of Canterbury
 John Paddock (b. 1951), Dean of Gibraltar (2008-)
 Robert Raikes (1736–1811), publisher and founder of Sunday School Movement
 George Whitefield (1714–1770), a leader of the Methodist movement
 James Frederick Wood, Archbishop of Philadelphia between 1860–83
 James Roose-Evans, theatre director and priest

Sports 
 John Gordon A'Bear, international rugby union player with the British and Irish Lions, and Gloucester's youngest ever captain.
 Charlie Hannaford, England rugby union international
 Grahame Parker, cricketer
 Wayne Thomas, professional footballer (Doncaster Rovers)
 Percy Stout, England rugby union international

Academia 
 Ernest Baldwin, professor of biochemistry at University College London from 1950–69
 Peter Bayley, professor of English at the University of St Andrews from 1978–85, and the first Principal of Collingwood College, Durham in 1972
 Derek Brewer, professor of English at the University of Cambridge from 1983 to 1990, Master of Emmanuel College, Cambridge from 1977 to 1990, and president of the English Association from 1982 to 1983 and 1987 tp 1990
 Thomas Edward Brown (1830–1897), poet, scholar, and head-master
 H. D. F. Kitto, classicist and professor of Greek at the University of Bristol from 1944–62

Arts 
 Capel Bond, organist
 Ian Dench, musician, best known as the guitarist from EMF
 Michael John Hurd, composer
 William Henley (1849–1903), poet and editor
 Anthony Calf, actor

Politics 
 Harold Collison, Baron Collison CBE, general secretary of the National Union of Agricultural and Allied Workers from 1953–69
 Robin Day (1923–2000), journalist, broadcaster and political commentator
 James Bruton, member of Parliament for Gloucester for the Unionist Party in 1918 and 1922

Other 
 Ian Bailey
Saajid Badat ,British terrorist

School song 
'Carmen Cryptiense', written in April 1926 with words by D. Gwynne Williams (Headmaster) and music by C. Lee Williams.

References

External links

 
 Old Cryptians Club for former pupils and teachers.
 The London Old Cryptians Club

1539 establishments in England
Educational institutions established in the 1530s
Schools in Gloucester
Grammar schools in Gloucestershire
Boys' schools in Gloucestershire
Academies in Gloucestershire